Wollastonia is the scientific name of several genera of organisms and may refer to:

Wollastonia (beetle) , a prehistoric genus of beetles in the family Hydrophilidae
Wollastonia (gastropod) , a genus of gastropods in the family Geomitridae
Wollastonia (plant), a genus of plants in the family Asteraceae